The Surname Law of the Republic of Turkey was adopted on 21 June 1934. The law requires all citizens of Turkey to adopt the use of fixed, hereditary surnames. Turkish families in the major urban centres had names by which they were known locally (often ending with the suffixes -zade, -oğlu or -gil), and were used in a similar manner with a surname. The Surname Law of 1934 enforced the use of official surnames but also stipulated that citizens choose Turkish names. Until it was repealed in 2013, the eldest male was the head of household and Turkish law appointed him to choose the surname. However  in his absence, death, or mental incapacitation the wife would do so.

Origin 

Instead of a European style surname, Muslims in the Ottoman Empire carried titles such as "Pasha", "Hoca", "Bey", "Hanım", "Agha", "Efendi". These titles either defined their formal profession (such as Pasha, Hoca, etc.) or their informal status within the society (such as Bey, Agha, Hanım, Efendi, etc.). Ottoman prime ministers (Sadrazam/Vezir-î Azam or Grand Vizier), ministers (Nazır/Vezir or Vizier), governors (Vali), other high-ranking civil servants and generals/admirals carried the title Pasha. Retired generals/admirals or high-ranking civil servants continued to carry this title in civilian life (a "Pasha" did not become a "Bey" after retiring from active military or political service.)

Turkish MP Refik Şefik İnce suggested that, instead of using the term Soyadı (Ancestry Name) Kanunu, the term Sanadı (Reputation Name) Kanunu should have been used for the Surname Law, referring to the method that was used for naming Muslim families in the Ottoman period, based on their reputation or fame in society. However, the Grand National Assembly of Turkey decided to use the term Soyadı because it denoted the meaning of ancestry, family, or relative.

Rules 
The articles of the Soy Adı Kanunu stipulated that: 
 All Turks must bear their surnames in addition to their proper names;
The surname must follow the proper name in signing, speaking and writing; 
Names may not relate to military rank and civil officialdom; to tribes, foreign races or ethnicities; nor may they be offensive or ridiculous. The use of "historical names" without the proper genealogical evidence is also forbidden.

The surname law specifically forbade certain surnames that contained connotations of foreign cultures, nations, tribes and religions. New surnames had to be taken from the Turkish language. The surname could be used with the oğlu ending but it was forbidden to use Armenian endings such as ian or yan, Slavic endings such as of (or ov), vich, ic, Greek endings such as is, dis, pulos, aki, Persian endings such as zade, and Arab endings such as mahdumu, veled, and bin, "referring to other ethnicities or taken from another language." For example, names such as Arnavutoğlu (the Albanian’s son) or Kürtoğlu (the Kurd's son), could not be used. Names of clans or tribes could not be used, or re-used. Additionally, names could not be duplicated in the same district, and, in case of any dispute, the family that registered first got the right to keep the claimed name.

Implementation 
As a result, many Greeks, Bulgarians, Albanians, Bosniaks, Jews, Arabs, Armenians, Assyrians, Georgians, Serbs and Kurds were forced to adopt last names of a more Turkish rendition, sometimes by directly translating their original surnames or otherwise just replacing markers such as Pontic Greek "ides" (son of) with Turkish “oğlu” (Kazantzoglou, Mitroglou, Mouratoglou, etc.).

See also
List of Ottoman titles and appellations
Turkification

References

External links
 

1934 in law
1934 in Turkey
Turkish culture
Law of Turkey
4th parliament of Turkey